Anthicus sacramento, the Sacramento anthicid beetle or Sacramento beetle, is a species of ant-like flower beetle that is endemic to California in the United States. It can be found in sand dune areas along the Sacramento and San Joaquin Rivers from Shasta to San Joaquin counties, and from the Feather River at Nicolaus. It is threatened by riverside development, canalization and river drainage.

References

Endemic fauna of the United States
Anthicidae
Endangered animals
Beetles described in 1978
Taxonomy articles created by Polbot